Siward (or Sigweard) was a medieval Bishop of Rochester.

Life

Siward was abbot of Chertsey Abbey, a Benedictine abbey in Surrey before he was selected for the see of Rochester. He was consecrated in 1058. He died in 1075. His death was commemorated on 30 October, so he probably died on that date in 1075. After the appointment of Lanfranc as Archbishop of Canterbury, the new archbishop found only four canons at Rochester under Siward's authority.

Citations

References

 British History Online Bishops of Rochester accessed on 30 October 2007

External links
 

Bishops of Rochester
11th-century English Roman Catholic bishops
1075 deaths
Abbots of Chertsey
Benedictine abbots
British Benedictines
Year of birth unknown